The Journal of Peace Research is a bimonthly peer-reviewed academic journal that publishes scholarly articles and book reviews in the fields of peace and conflict studies, conflict resolution, and international security. It was established by Johan Galtung in 1964 and has been published since 1998. Nils Petter Gleditsch was editor-in-chief from 1983 to 2010; between 2010–2017 the editor was Henrik Urdal, and as of July 2010 the editor is Gudrun Østby (all researchers at the Peace Research Institute Oslo).

Abstracting and indexing 
Journal of Peace Research is abstracted and indexed in Scopus and the Social Sciences Citation Index. According to the Journal Citation Reports, its 2017 impact factor is 2.419, ranking it 14th out of 86 journals in the category "International Relations" and 32nd out of 169 journals in the category "Political Science".

See also 
 List of political science journals

References

External links 
 
 Journal page at the Peace Research Institute Oslo

International relations journals
SAGE Publishing academic journals
Bimonthly journals
English-language journals
Publications established in 1964